William Marmion (c. 1461 – 1529) of Adwell was an English gentleman who served as one of the Members of Parliament for Gloucester in 1491.

Career and Life

He was the son of William Marmion of Henley-on-Thames, Steward of Dorchester Abbey and Recorder of Oxford.

William Marmion was elected to Parliament on 17 October 1491.

He was the grandfather of John Marmion MP for Cricklade in 1558.

Notes

References

Bibliography
 
 
 
 

English MPs 1491
Members of the Parliament of England for Gloucestershire
People from South Oxfordshire District
1460s births
1529 deaths